Way Upstate and the Crippled Summer, pt. 1 is an EP by Frontier Ruckus, released in 2009 between the releases of The Orion Songbook and Deadmalls & Nightfalls. It is only available on the double-vinyl edition of the former.

Track listing
All songs written by Matthew Milia
"One-Story-Carport-Houses"
"The Great Laketown"
"Ann Arbortown"
"Mohawk, New York"
"Driving Home, Christmas Eve"
"Abigail"

Personnel
Frontier Ruckus
Matthew Milia – lead vocals, guitar, pedal steel guitar
David Winston Jones – banjo, dobro, voice
Ryan "Smalls" Etzcorn – drum kit, all percussion, background vocals
Zachary Nichols – trumpet, singing-saw, melodica
Anna Burch – voice
Guest Musicians
Ryan Hay – piano on track 1, background vocals on track 1
John Krohn – bass guitar on track 1, background vocals on track 1
Angelica Tovar – background vocals on track 1

Production
Produced by Frontier Ruckus
Engineered by John Krohn
Assistant engineer on track 1 was Ian Walker
Mastered by Glenn Brown
Artwork and Design by Matthew Milia
Recorded and Mixed at Deep Deep Pink in Lansing, Michigan during the summer of 2007 and winter of 2008–2009

References

External links 
 

2009 EPs
Frontier Ruckus albums